Sarigan  is an uninhabited volcanic island in the Pacific Ocean. It is part of the Northern Mariana Islands, a U.S. territory.

History
Sarigan was originally settled by the Chamorros. The island was first charted by Europeans in late October 1543 by Spanish explorer Bernardo de la Torre on board of the carrack San Juan de Letrán when trying to return from Sarangani to New Spain. In 1695, the natives were forcibly removed to Saipan, and three years later to Guam.

Following the sale of the Northern Marianas by Spain to the German Empire in 1899, Agrigan was administered as part of German New Guinea. The island was used as a penal colony from 1900 to 1906. The prisoners, who lived some with their families on Sarigan were mainly employed by the coconut plantations. In 1909, the island was leased by the Pagan Society, a German-Japanese partnership, which continued to export copra. The company also employed fowlers to hunt birds for feathers for export to Japan and Europe. However, the Pagan Society fell into financial difficulties from 1912.

During World War I, Sarigan came under the control of the Empire of Japan and was subsequently administered as part of the South Seas Mandate. In the 1930s, between 10 and 20 families lived on the island.

Following World War II, the island came under the control of the United States and 
after World War II, the residents were removed from the island. As of 1947, the island was administered as part of the Trust Territory of the Pacific Islands. Since 1978, the island has been part of the Northern Islands Municipality of the Commonwealth of the Northern Mariana Islands.

Today, the island is a nature preserve, and in the mid-1990s, a project was launched to rid Sarigan of its population of feral animals; today, only a few cats remain. Sarigan has been proposed as a site for relocation of endangered birds from Guam and Saipan.

Sarigan was declared off-limits by the government of the Northern Mariana Islands after the eruption.

Geography

The volcano is topped by a caldera, 750 meters in diameter, with an ash cone and two lava domes, which produced lava flows which reached the coast. No eruptions have been recorded in the historical period, although a swarm of volcano-tectonic earthquakes took place here in the summer of 2005.

Landing on Sarigan is difficult because perpendicular cliffs surround much of the island. It has many ravines and valleys with dense tropical vegetation, particularly on the northern side of the island. To the north of the plateau are steep, vegetation-covered slopes, which go down to the sea.

It briefly erupted in May 2010 producing a plume of water vapor about 12 km high.

Important Bird Area
The island has been recognised as an Important Bird Area (IBA) by BirdLife International because it supports populations of Micronesian megapodes, white-throated ground doves, Micronesian myzomelas and Micronesian starlings.

Notes

References
 Russell E. Brainard et al.: Coral reef ecosystem monitoring report of the Mariana Archipelago: 2003–2007. (=PIFSC Special Publication, SP-12-01) NOAA Fisheries, Pacific Islands Fisheries Science Center 2012 (Kapitel Alamagan (englisch, PDF, 12,2 MB)).
 Richard B. Moore, Frank A. Trusdell: Geologic map of Alamagan Volcano, northern Mariana Islands. United States Geological Survey 1993 (Download).

External links 

 Google Maps: Sarigan 
 
 Pascal Horst Lehne and Christoph Gäbler: Über die Marianen. Lehne-Verlag, Wohldorf in Germany 1972. and Sarigan 

Stratovolcanoes of the United States
Volcanoes of the Northern Mariana Islands
Islands of the Northern Mariana Islands
Former German colonies
Uninhabited islands of the Northern Mariana Islands
Important Bird Areas of the Northern Mariana Islands